Maison James Norman Hall is a historic house museum in Arue, French Polynesia. It exhibits the home of writer James Norman Hall, as it was in 1951 at the time of his death. Its collection includes a 3,000-volume library and the author's typewriter.

History 
The museum was the home of the writer James Norman Hall, his Tahitian wife Sarah Teraureia Winchester, and their children. Hall settled in Tahiti in 1924 and built the house himself in 1926, where between 1932 and 1934, he co-wrote the three volumes of The Bounty Trilogy.

Whilst Hall died in 1951, his wife continued to live there until her death in 1985. After 1985, the house then began to fall into disrepair and in 1991 it was purchased by the government of French Polynesia.

Administration 
On 20 July 1993, the house was declared a historical monument. However, due to a lack of funds, the building continued to degrade. By the mid-1990s, the house was a ruin, however, Hall's daughter Nancy then worked with the French Polynesian government to restore the home to its 1951 condition. It opened as a museum on 17 January 2002. As of 2008, the museum was managed by the Association of the Friends of the James Norman Hall Home, who report both to the government of French Polynesia and to Hall's descendants.

Collection 
The museum's collection includes Hall's 3,000-volume library, his typewriter and other objects. The displays also include personal effects on loan from the Hall family. "The house itself is neither large nor prepossessing; it was built for comfort and practicality," wrote author and screenwriter Peter Benchley. "It's what's inside the house that I found most fascinating: paintings, photographs, artefacts and anecdotes from Hall's preliterary life."

Public engagement 
In 2018, the Minister of Tourism, Nicole Bouteau, alongside Nancy Rutgers-Hall, opened a new terraced area at the museum, which expanded its capacity for catering and conference provision. As of 2021, the museum provided personalised guided tours, where visitors could choose the aspects of the site they wanted to discover.

Legacy 
Alongside the Robert Louis Stevenson Museum in Samoa, the museum is considered an important site for European colonial heritage in the Pacific.

Gallery

References

External links 

 Tere, le musée James Norman Hall

Museums in French Polynesia
Buildings and structures in French Polynesia
Museums dedicated to James Norman Hall
Historic house museums